The Man in the Fog (German: Der Mann im Nebel) is a 1920 German silent film directed by Mutz Greenbaum and starring Victor Colani, Rolf Loer and Hans Mierendorff.

Cast
 Victor Colani as Mann im Nebel  
 Rolf Loer 
 Hans Mierendorff as Harry Higgs - detective

References

Bibliography
 Hans-Michael Bock and Tim Bergfelder. The Concise Cinegraph: An Encyclopedia of German Cinema. Berghahn Books.

External links

1920 films
Films of the Weimar Republic
Films directed by Mutz Greenbaum
German silent feature films
German black-and-white films